The 1985–86 IHL season was the 41st season of the International Hockey League, a North American minor professional league. 10 teams participated in the regular season, and the Muskegon Lumberjacks won the Turner Cup.

Regular season

Turner Cup-Playoffs

External links
 Season 1985/86 on hockeydb.com

IHL
International Hockey League (1945–2001) seasons